Luis Rodolfo Quiñonez is a Guatemalan-born American Vietnam War veteran and business executive. He serves as the chief executive officer of IQ Management Services, a mental health defense contractor. In December 2016, he was interviewed by president-elect Donald Trump for the position of United States Secretary of Veterans Affairs. He serves as the president of the United States-Central American Chamber of Commerce, and he is a co-founder of the Hispanic College Fund.
On December 6, President Donald Trump appointed him to the American Battle Monuments Commission.

References

Living people
Guatemalan emigrants to the United States
American chief executives
American politicians of Guatemalan descent
Hispanic and Latino American politicians
United States Marine Corps officers
United States Navy officers
United States Navy reservists
Year of birth missing (living people)